Agassiz Wilderness was designated in 1976 by the United States Congress and has a total of 4,000 acres (16 km2). It is located in the U.S. state of Minnesota.  The wilderness is in Agassiz National Wildlife Refuge and is managed by the U.S. Fish and Wildlife Service. Well known for being a prime habitat for over 300 bird species, 49 mammal, 12 amphibian, and 9 reptile species have also been identified.

See also
List of U.S. Wilderness Areas
Wilderness Act

References

External links
Agassiz Wilderness - Wilderness.net
Agassiz Wilderness - GORP
Agassiz Wilderness - Recreation.gov

Protected areas of Marshall County, Minnesota
Wilderness areas of Minnesota